ZipRealty is a website that offers real estate listings and homes for sale as part of Realogy’s company-owned brokerage operations, NRT LLC. Ziprealty.com is maintained by ZapLabs LLC, the innovation and technology development division of Realogy.

History
Founded in 1999 by Scott Kucirek and Juan Mini, two graduates of the University of California, Berkeley’s Haas School of Business, ZipRealty operated in 35 metropolitan areas in 22 states and the District of Columbia. Headquartered in Emeryville, CA and incorporated in Delaware, the company went public in November 2004 and traded on NASDAQ under the ticker symbol ZIPR.

ZipRealty, Inc. was started as an independent U.S. real estate brokerage firm with licensed agents in offices nationwide, who sell real estate on ZipRealty.com. After operating a tech-enabled brokerage for 15 years, the company was acquired by Realogy in 2014, maintaining the technology division as part of the Realogy Franchise Group, and adding the ZipRealty brokerage into Realogy's company-owned brokerage operations, NRT.

In June 2016, the technology division rebranded itself as ZapLabs LLC. This was to differentiate itself from the brokerage and to establish itself as the central source of real estate technology solutions for Realogy's franchise brands, with solutions designed to serve brokers and agents as well as home buyers and sellers. In March 2017, ZipRealty's sales professionals joined another brokerage, Coldwell Banker United Realtors.

References

1999 establishments in California
American real estate websites
Companies based in Emeryville, California
Online real estate databases
Real estate companies established in 1999
Real estate valuation